Bath Council may refer to:

Bath, Somerset
Bath Council, BSA